Rural Space (1972) was the fifth album released by Brewer & Shipley.

Track listing
all songs Brewer & Shipley except where marked

Side A
"Yankee Lady" (Jesse Winchester) – 3:25
"Sleeping On the Way" – 2:19
"When the Truth Finally Comes" – 2:33
"Where Do We Go from Here" – 2:17
"Blue Highway" (David Getz, Nick Gravenites) – 6:24

Side B
"Fly Fly Fly" – 3:08
"Crested Butte" (Michael Brewer) – 2:23
"Got to Get Off The Island" – 3:12
"Black Sky" (Steve Cash) – 3:39
"Have a Good Life" – 2:29

Personnel
Mike Brewer – vocals, guitars
Tom Shipley – vocals, guitars
Billy Mundi, Prairie Prince, Bill Vitt – drums
Fred Burton – electric guitars
Mark Naftalin – piano, organ, vibraphone
John Kahn – bass
Phil Howe – soprano saxophone
Buddy Cage – pedal steel guitar

References

1972 albums
Brewer & Shipley albums
Albums recorded at Wally Heider Studios
Kama Sutra Records albums